Asfar Hossain Mollah ( – 13 May 2016) was a Bangladeshi physician and politician from Gazipur belonging to Bangladesh Awami League. He was a member of the Jatiya Sangsad. He was a member of Bangladesh Medical Association.

Biography
Mollah was the son of Hafiz Uddin Mollah and Begum Shahida Mollah. He was the vice president of Dhaka Medical College Central Students' Union and presidium member of Jubo League. He was a member of Bangladesh Medical Association too. He was elected as a member of the Jatiya Sangsad from Gazipur-3 in 1991.
 
Mollah died on 13 May 2016 in Bangabandhu Sheikh Mujib Medical University Hospital at the age of 63.

References

People from Gazipur District
5th Jatiya Sangsad members
1950s births
2016 deaths
Awami League politicians
Bangladeshi physicians
Dhaka Medical College alumni